Edwin Nicholas "Nick" Arnold (b. 1940), is a British herpetologist and former Curator of Herpetology at the Natural History Museum, London. Arnold made seminal contributions to the herpetology of Europe and North Africa, especially on geckos and lizards of the family Lacertidae. He discovered and described 36 species and 4 subspecies of reptiles, and wrote A Field Guide to the Reptiles and Amphibians of Britain and Europe, which appeared over multiple editions.

Honors
At least four species of reptiles have been named in Arnold's honor:

Hemidactylus arnoldi 
Asaccus arnoldi 
Mesalina arnoldi 
Dipsochelys arnoldi  (sometimes considered a subspecies of Aldabrachelys gigantea)

Publications
Arnold EN (1973). "Relationships of the Palearctic lizards assigned to the genera Lacerta, Algyroides and Psammodromus (Reptilia: Lacertidae)". Bulletin of the British Museum (Natural History), Zoology 25: 289-366.
Arnold EN (2009). "Relationships, evolution and biogeography of Semaphore geckos, Pristurus (Squamata, Sphaerodactylidae) based on morphology". Zootaxa 2060: 1-21.
Arnold EN, Arribas O, Carranza S (2007). "Systematics of the Palearctic and Oriental lizard tribe Lacertini (Squamata: Lacertidae: Lacertinae), with decriptions of eight new genera". Zootaxa 1430: 1-86.
Arnold EN, Burton JA (1978). A Field Guide to Reptiles and Amphibians of Britain and Europe. (Illustrated by D. W. Ovenden). London: Collins. 272 pp. + Plates 1-40. .

References

British herpetologists
1940 births
Living people
British curators